The Katzenstein House is a historic house at 902 West 5th Street in Pine Bluff, Arkansas.  It is a two-story brick building, capped by a clipped-gable tile roof. An enclosed front porch projects from the left side of the front.  The main gable features a band of five casement windows, and both the main gable and the porch gable feature half-timbered stucco finish.  The house was designed by Charles L. Thompson and built in 1913.  It is an unusual blending of Craftsman styling applied to an largely American Foursquare plan.

The house was listed on the National Register of Historic Places in 1982.

See also
National Register of Historic Places listings in Jefferson County, Arkansas

References

Houses completed in 1913
Houses in Pine Bluff, Arkansas
Houses on the National Register of Historic Places in Arkansas
National Register of Historic Places in Pine Bluff, Arkansas